In military terms, 105th Division may refer to:

Infantry divisions
 105th Division (1st Formation)(People's Republic of China), 1948–1950
 105th Division (2nd Formation)(People's Republic of China), 1951–1958
 105th Infantry Division (German Empire)
 105th Division (Imperial Japanese Army), part of Southern Expeditionary Army Group
 105th Motorised Division Rovigo, a unit of the Italian Army during World War II

Armoured divisions
 105th Armored Division (North Korea)

sl:Seznam divizij po zaporednih številkah (100. - 149.)#105. divizija